The 1st Mechanized Infantry Brigade as a higher joint-tactical unit represents a major combat force of the Macedonian army that provides prepared forces for protection and support of national interests and provides support during natural disasters, epidemics and other dangers. Outside the territory of the Republic of Macedonia, the declared units are participating in peacekeeping operations and they fulfill the international military responsibilities.

History

The 14th MMNABr  set off on 18 September, immediately after its formation, via village Budinarci to stop the advance of the fascists troops towards Vinica.

The next task of the brigade was to liberate Kochani. After that it preceded its movement towards Kochani – Shtip – Sveti Nikole. Later during the war it was engaged in the operation of liberating Skopje as well as fighting the enemy forces in the direction of Tetotvo. On 12 January 1945 it participated fighting on the Sremski Front in the area between Shid and the river Danube when it suffered the biggest losses. On 26 May it operated near Celje – Slovenia and on its way back it took part in the battles on the territory of Bosnia and Herzegovina. On 15 June 1945 it entered Skopje with a parade march and ended its famous combat career. 423 members of the brigade gave their lives fighting against the fascists’ forces.

The 1st Mechanized Infantry Brigade is the successor of this famous unit and it carries out its tradition.
The 1st Mechanized Infantry Brigade is directly connected with the formation of the Army of the independent Republic of Macedonia. The first servicemen in ARM were from this unit. During the past years the brigade went through a process of transformation and now it is defined as a small, modern, mobile and professional unit prepared to cope with all the challenges of the modern time.

The personnel and the units of the 1st Mechanized Infantry Brigade have participated at many courses, seminars, military exercises and international peace keeping missions in country and abroad.
The gained knowledge was implemented in the preparation of the personnel to take part in the peace keeping missions in Afghanistan, Iraq, Bosnian and Lebanon.

The first biggest contingent from this brigade (sized an infantry company) was deployed to the ISAF mission in Afghanistan.  The same unit has successfully participated in military exercises "Macedonian Flash" 1, 3, 4, 5 and 6 and has conducted NATO self-evaluation level 1 and level 2 according to NATO concept for operational abilities.

On 18 August 2007 the Brigade was awarded a "Decoration for merit" given by the President of the Republic of Macedonia.

Tasks
Preparation for combat operations of the forces for conducting offensive and defensive operations;
Performing tactical marches;
Planning and implementation of continuous training for combat terrorist groups;
Planning and implementation of continuous training of commands and units of the 1st MIB according to NATO standards and procedures, and ensuring full implementation of the system for management training and leadership development and training for instructors;
Giving support to the forces of the Ministry of Interior in dealing with the threats, risks and threats to the security of Republic of Macedonia;
Providing support to the state government, local governments, citizens and non-governmental organizations and institutions in dealing with natural disasters and epidemics, tactical and technological and other disasters;
Rapid deployment of forces in multinational joint operations led by NATO or in peace keeping operations led by NATO, the UN and the EU;
Readiness of  the Middle Infantry Battalion Group (MIBG) for NATO-led operations;
Training and readiness of the company declared in the forces of EUBG;
Participation and assistance in humanitarian operations in the region and beyond;
Developing the ability to defend the forces from improvised explosive devices;
Implementation of effective command, control and safety communication skills;
Survival and protection of forces in conditions of close combat, threats from chemical, biological, radioactive and nuclear weapons.

Missions
Within the peace keeping mission ISAF in Afghanistan our unit has participated with two rotations (January and July). During an ongoing mission a preparations for the next mission are conducted. We have participated in ISAF with a Mechanized Infantry Company for securing the base and the staff personnel.
The whole personnel of these units are under JOC operative command.

The benefit ARM gained from the participation in ISAF mission is that the lessons learned will be used in the future. For Republic of Macedonia, to have highly trained and professional soldiers, who in the last decades, have greatly contributed to the image of the ISAF mission and the Alliance is a great honor.  Republic of Macedonia and its citizens are proud of the ARM servicemen who are not only the guards of the state sovereignty, but are ambassadors of the peace together with their NATO colleagues who have contributed to the development of the democracy in Afghanistan.

Structure

1st Mechanized Infantry Battalion "Scorpions" 

Mission:
To conduct offensive and defensive operations for defense and security of the territorial integrity and sovereignty of North Macedonia ;
To cooperate with MIA in securing the borders;
To support the civilian authorities dealing with the consequences of the natural disasters and catastrophes;
To take part in peace support missions and humanitarian missions abroad.

Tasks:
To prepare for combat tasks;
Tactical march;
To take firing position
To prepare for level 2 NATO assessment  according to the concept for operational capability;
Tactical movement;
To conduct defense tasks;
To conduct attacks;
Tasks for fighting against sabotage terroristic groups;
To take part in peace keeping missions.

The 1st Mechanized Infantry battalion as part of the 1st Mechanized Infantry Brigade located in Shtip started operating in Kumanovo in September 2000 under the name "Homour and Strength" land is located in Kristijan Todorovki Karposh barracks.  Major Joco Micev was appointed a commander of the battalion and his deputy was Captain 1st class Sinisha Stamenov. Later, Major Sinisha Stamenov becomes a commander and his deputy was Major Ljupcho Dimitrov. From 2005 our unit conducts tasks in Kumanovo garrison and has established cooperation with local government of town Kumanovo and many private and state subjects. Many awards and plaques are evident of this fruitful cooperation.

2nd Mechanized Infantry Battalion "Scorpions" 
Mission:
To conduct offensive and defensive operations in order to protect the integrity and sovereignty of the territory North Macedonia;
To cooperate with MIA in the area of border guard;
To support civilian government when alleviating the aftermaths of natural and other disasters;
To support peacekeeping operations and humanitarian operations out of R. of North Macedonia;
Combat readiness level has been reached and maintained making progress in many areas, primarily training and preparing for TELA;
Battalion units have completely reached the necessary combat readiness level.

Tasks:
Personnel physical readiness;
Firearms training of individuals and units;
Training according to BMP;
Specialized –professional training;
Personnel training for peacekeeping missions participation;
English language training.

2nd Mechanized Infantry Battalion was formed in 1996 under the name of "Scorpions" as a unit of the 11th Infantry Brigade.Since it was formed up to present moment the battalion has taken part in 24 international exercises organized by NATO PfP countries. It contributed with personnel and technique and represented ARM and Republic of North Macedonia.

3rd Mechanized Infantry Battalion "Leopards" 
Mission:
To prepare and organize the defence and protection of the territorial integrity and sovereignty and independence of the Republic of North Macedonia. To  assist, within it area of operation, the MIA during operations if the security of the country is endangered.  To support the state authorities, the local government and various institutions and organizations as well as the citizens when dealing with natural disasters, epidemics, technical and technological catastrophes in its area of operation.
To take part in peace keeping missions and conflicts prevention NATO, UN, OSCE and EU led activities. To contribute to dealing with regional conflicts and crises as well as to protect the wider interests of the North Macedonia.

Tasks:
To alert, move, transport and rapidly deploy the units to places, areas  and regions
To plan, organize and conduct offensive and defensive operations and urban area operations
To control the territory, to seal directions and to secure regions
To give combat-service supports to the units in peace time, during crisis and war
To conduct command and control
To support MIA when dealing with threats, risks and dangers for the security of the North Macedonia
To support the state authorities and local government units when dealing with natural disasters, epidemics and technical and technological catastrophes
To take part in peace keeping missions and conflicts prevention missions abroad and to protect wider interests of RM
To plan and conduct personnel and commands training according to NATO standards and procedures and to fully implement the system for training management, to develop leaders – training instructors.

4th Mechanized Infantry Battalion "Leopards" 
Mission:
To prepare and organize the defence and protection of the territorial integrity and sovereignty and independence of the North Macedonia. To  assist, within it area of operation, the MIA during operations if the security of the country is endangered.  To support the state authorities, the local government and various institutions and organizations as well as the citizens when dealing with natural disasters, epidemics, technical and technological catastrophes in its area of operation.
To take part in peace keeping missions and conflicts prevention NATO, UN, OSCE and EU led activities. To contribute to dealing with regional conflicts and crises as well as to protect the wider interests of North Macedonia.

Tasks:
To alert, move, transport and rapidly deploy the units to places, areas  and regions
To plan, organize and conduct offensive and defensive operations and urban area operations
To control the territory, to seal directions and to secure regions
To give combat-service supports to the units in peace time, during crisis and war
To conduct command and control
To support MIA when dealing with threats, risks and dangers for the security of the Republic of North Macedonia
To support the state authorities and local government units when dealing with natural disasters, epidemics and technical and technological catastrophes
To take part in peace keeping missions and conflicts prevention missions abroad and to protect wider interests of RM

To plan and conduct personnel and commands training according to NATO standards and procedures and to fully implement the system for training management, to develop leaders – training instructors.

Artillery Battalion
Mission:
To prepare its fire support forces for the units of the 1st mib, for defense and protection of the territorial integrity and sovereignty of the Republic of North Macedonia in all weather and field conditions, preparation of the declared unit habt 105 mm for operations in support of peace and prevention of conflicts and crises in operations led by NATO, UN, OSCE, EU and other international alliances and to contribute to the protection of the wider interests of the Republic of North Macedonia.

Tasks:
Alerting the unit and taking possession of areas and positions
Tactical Movement and taking possession of fire positions and areas
Coordination of the fire support and artillery fire management
Conducting and maintaining command and control
Implementation of combat support
Performing mobilization and rapid integration of the active members
Preparation of the declared unit
Providing support to the government, the local government units, the citizens and the non-governmental organizations and institutions in dealing with natural disasters and epidemics – technical technological and other disasters
Planning and carrying out training to achieve NATO standards.

Armor Battalion
Mission:
To train and prepare the soldiers, officers and units for defense and protection of the territorial integrity, independence and sovereignty of the Republic of North Macedonia, from all possible threats, as well as in dealing with natural disasters or other accidents.
Applying the standards and following an order issued by the 1st Mechanized Infantry Battalion to perform marching and carry out mobile, combined, defense and attack operations in the area of responsibility.

Tasks:
Planned, organized and on-time operational development and maneuver.
Occupation of the planned locations and regions.
Organization and carrying out of tactical exercise on the level of a platoon, a company and a battalion.
Preparation and training of the forces to provide help in case of natural disasters or other accidents.
Securing facilities of strategic importance.

With the new formation of the Army of the Republic of North Macedonia on 19 December 2011 the Armor Battalion T-55 was reformed and the T-72 "A" Armour Battalion was formed under the command of GS of ARM. The new battalion consisted of 31 T-72 tanks and 11-OT BMP engaging 147 officers and professional soldiers.

Engineer Battalion
Mission:
Prepared to give engineer support to the commands and units of ARM.  Prepared to cooperate with the units of the MoI  in crisis situations, gives support to the civil authorities in case of disasters and other  crisis, as well as provides support  to help authorities deal with consequences of natural disasters and armed conflicts.

Tasks:
Plans, organises and conducts engineer reconnaissance,
Performs tactical march,
Maintains the facilities for protection and carries out activities for the needs of the commands and units of ARM,
Prepares and eliminates smaller explosive obstacles and prepares and deals with artificial  obstacles,
Secures the movement and maneuver of the Combat Service Support units (CSS),
Prepares and eliminates smaller explosive obstacles and eliminates artificial obstacles in cooperation with MOI units in case of crisis,
Conducts humanitarian and logistic operations supporting the civil authorities in case of danger and helps them  deal with the consequences of natural disasters and armed conflicts,
Assists civil authorities in reconstructing infrastructure damaged during natural disasters and armed conflicts.

NBC Protection Company
Mission:
To provide a high level of training and combat readiness in peacetime and alertness for organization and execution of tasks for NBC protection support for the Forces and their need for rapid reaction in all conditions.

To prepare and execute mobilization of the reserve forces and reach full readiness for  organization and execution of tasks for NBC protection support  for the needs of the  Forces under the command of the 1st Mechanized Infantry Brigade in performing combat tasks in assigned areas.

Tasks:
Providing a high level of training of officers, soldiers and the unit as a whole to perform purpose oriented tasks in peace and in war;Training and exercising overall unit composition in the procedures of signal alarm;Training and exercising overall unit composition in the procedures of moving in a region undertaking all combat security measures;Execution of tactical actions and procedures by the NBC reconnaissance units while organizing and conducting NBC protection control;Execution of tactical actions and procedures by the NBC decontamination units while organizing and conducting NC decontamination of personnel, weapons, technical assets, motor vehicles, land and buildings.

Signal Company
Mission:
The Signal Company establishes all connections scheduled for the needs of the 1st Mechanized Infantry Brigade under the Signal Plan "BRAN".

History:
The signal company is part of the 1st Mechanized Infantry Brigade and is located in the barracks "N.H. - Petrovec". Its beginning was in September 2000 in the barracks "Jane Sandanski" - Shtip where it becomes a part of 1st Infantry Brigade (1st IB) under the motto "Honor and Strength".
First commander of the brigade was Captain Zoranco Trenev, who after several years with the transformation in 1st infantry brigade into 1st Mechanized Infantry Brigade (1st MIB) in March 2006 was replaced by the next company commander Captain Zoran Aleksov.

Tasks:
Alert and unit assembly.
Tactical march.
Establishment and maintenance of all scheduled connections.
Force protection.

Equipment

See also
Army of the Republic of North Macedonia
North Macedonia Air Force
 Special Operations Regiment
 The Rangers Battalion
 Ceremonial Guard Battalion
Military Reserve Force (North Macedonia)
 Military Service for Security and Intelligence
North Macedonia

References

Military units and formations of North Macedonia
Military units and formations established in 2007